Breckenridge Township is one of twelve townships in Caldwell County, Missouri, and is part of the Kansas City metropolitan area with the USA.  As of the 2000 census, its population was 627.

Breckenridge Township was organized in 1821, and most likely was named for the river bluffs within its borders.

Geography

References

External links
 US-Counties.com
 City-Data.com

Townships in Caldwell County, Missouri
Townships in Missouri
1821 establishments in Missouri